The seventeenth season of the American animated television series The Simpsons originally aired between September 2005 and May 2006, beginning on Sunday, September 11, 2005. It broke Fox's tradition of pushing its shows' season premieres back to November to accommodate the Major League Baseball games airing on the network during September and October of each year. Season 17 was released on DVD and Blu-ray in Region 1 on December 2, 2014, Region 2 on December 1, 2014, and Region 4 on December 3, 2014.

Production
Al Jean remained show runner, with this being his fifth year in the position since he started it in season 13, while the season was produced by Gracie Films and 20th Century Fox Television. David Silverman was the supervising director of animation. New writers included Patric Verrone (previously a writer for The Critic, Futurama, and current president of the Writers Guild of America, Western Division), Daniel Chun, and Stephane Gillis. During this season, there were no episodes that aired during the month of October.

Seven hold-over episodes from the season 16 (GABF) production line aired as part of this season. One of these episodes, "The Girl Who Slept Too Little", was intended to air as the season 16 finale on May 15, 2005, but after "The Father, the Son, and the Holy Guest Star", an episode satirizing the Catholic Church, was postponed due to Pope John Paul II's death, it was moved into this season.

Reception

Reviews 
The season was met with mixed-to-positive reviews. Jeffry Kauffman of Blu-ray.com gave the season 4/5. He said the season was "arguably an incremental step downward" but he still thought "There are still delights galore to be sampled throughout the season," Shadowlocked gave the season 4/5 stars. Luke Connolly said that the season did a great job at tying things together and praised "Girls Just Want to have Sums" and "We're on the Road to D'ohwhere" as highlights. He concluded by saying "While season 17 shows its age in certain places, its continual pursuit of originality and familiar comedy more than makes up for this, and one cannot help but be impressed." Fanboy Nation's Sean Mukvihill was positive on the season saying "Even though it isn't as a great as it once was, the show still boast some very clever writing and the best voice cast of any animated program in history." Capsule Computers was more critical of the season giving the season 5.5/10 and commented "As a long time fan of the early Simpsons that involved great episodes with hilarious, tightly developed plots, it is hard to stomach what the show has become." Spotlight Report gave the season 3.0/5 criticizing that it wasn't as funny as previous seasons.

Awards
"The Seemingly Neverending Story" won an Emmy for Outstanding Animated Program, the first Simpsons episode to win since season 14's "Three Gays of the Condo" and the ninth time in the history of the show. Kelsey Grammer received the Emmy for Outstanding Voice-Over Performance for "The Italian Bob".

Nielsen ratings
The show ranked 56th in the seasonal ratings tied with Invasion, America's Funniest Home Videos, and The Amazing Race with a viewership 9.2 million viewers and an 18–49 Nielsen Rating of 4.4/11.

Episodes

Blu-ray and DVD release
The DVD and Blu-ray box set for season seventeen was released by 20th Century Fox Home Entertainment in the United States and Canada on Tuesday, December 2, 2014, eight years after it had completed broadcast on television. As well as every episode from the season, the Blu-ray and DVD releases feature bonus material including deleted scenes, animatics, and commentaries for every episode. The box art features Sideshow Bob, and a special limited-edition "embossed head case" package was also released.

This is the only season of The Simpsons to receive a 15 rating in the UK, but this is due to the additional material (the episodes are only a 12 rating).

References

Bibliography

External links
Season 17 at The Simpsons.com

Simpsons season 17
2005 American television seasons
2006 American television seasons